The combined discography of Tunnel Rats, a West Coast underground Christian hip hop collective founded in 1993 in Whittier, California, is three studio albums, a collaborative compilation album, several compilation appearances, one guest appearance, one music video, and a collection of unfinished material. Named after the tunnel rats in the Vietnam war, the mixed-gender, multi-racial collective has included twenty individual members and incorporated six affiliated groups: LPG, Future Shock, Footsoldiers, the Foundation, New Breed, and the Resistance, which have recorded both within Tunnel Rats and independently. The collective has released three albums under the Tunnel Rats name: Experience (1996), Tunnel Vision (2001), and Tunnel Rats (2004). They also collaborated on a compilation album released through Uprock Records, Underground Rise, Volume 1: Sunrise/Sunset (2003). Though currently on hiatus, Tunnel Rats has not disbanded, according to a statement by member Peace 586.

Studio albums

Compilation albums

Guest appearances

Music videos

Miscellaneous

References

Discographies of American artists
Hip hop discographies
Christian music discographies